Rémi Elissalde (born 1 January 1991) is a French professional footballer who plays as a midfielder. He has previously played in Ligue 1 with Bordeaux and Ligue 2 for Orléans.

Career statistics

Honours
Orléans
 Championnat National: 2013–14

References

External links
 
 

1991 births
Living people
Sportspeople from Biarritz
French footballers
Association football midfielders
FC Girondins de Bordeaux players
Aviron Bayonnais FC players
US Orléans players
SO Romorantin players
Stade Bordelais (football) players
Ligue 1 players
Ligue 2 players
Championnat National players
Championnat National 2 players
Championnat National 3 players
French-Basque people
Footballers from Nouvelle-Aquitaine